MV FAS Provence was a cargo ship that sank in January 2012 off the coast of Malta.

She was built in 1986 by Rickmers Reismühlen in Bremerhaven, Germany as MV Britta Thien, and sailed under the German flag for two years. She did not operate between 1988 and 1997, when she was renamed and reflagged as a Bahamian ship. At the time of her sinking, she was operated by Döhle (IOM) Ltd.

FAS Provence had a gross tonnage of 6,071 and a deadweight tonnage of 8,050 tonnes. She was powered by a single diesel engine, and had a speed of sixteen knots.

References

1986 ships
Maritime incidents in 2012
Shipwrecks in the Mediterranean Sea